Keith Fordyce (15 October 1928 – 15 March 2011) was an English disc jockey and presenter on British radio and television. He is most famous as the first presenter of ITV's Ready Steady Go! in 1963, but was a stalwart of both BBC radio and Radio Luxembourg for many years.

Career
Born Keith Fordyce Marriott in Lincoln, Lincolnshire, he attended Lincoln School and later studied law at Emmanuel College, Cambridge. In 1955 he came to the attention of British radio listeners as a staff announcer at Radio Luxembourg where he worked with Barry Alldis.

Fordyce later worked for the BBC Light Programme in the 1960s, with such programmes as the lunchtime Pop In show, and went on to host the television talent show Thank Your Lucky Stars On 9 August 1963 he presented the first edition of Ready Steady Go! on Associated Rediffusion television, being joined subsequently in 1964 by Cathy McGowan and Michael Aldred. McGowan took over the show when Fordyce left in 1965.

In 1967 he provided the commentary for the BBC's first colour test transmission on BBC2, the first men's singles final of the Open era at Wimbledon. He presented a game show for Westward Television called Treasure Hunt (not to be confused with the later Channel 4 programme of the same name). In the early 1980s, he rejoined Radio Luxembourg in the Grand Duchy after Barry Alldis's death, working in the Villa Louvigny again for six months, and regularly attracting audiences of 250,000 or more for his programmes.

On 12 February 1983 he was the first presenter of Radio 2's Sounds of the 60s. He also hosted Radio 2's Beat The Record for many years. He later hosted a record programme on west of England local radio. Prior to his retirement Fordyce worked for the BBC Regional service in Devon, based at the Radio Devon studios, doing regular weekend shows.

Personal life
Fordyce retired in Devon with his wife Anne. He founded the Torbay Aircraft Museum in the 1970s. He supported the Liberal Party and spoke in support of David Penhaligon at a 1970s election meeting in Truro. He died on 15 March 2011 aged 82 after suffering from pneumonia and Alzheimer's disease.

References

External links

1928 births
2011 deaths
Alumni of Emmanuel College, Cambridge
British radio personalities
British radio DJs
British television presenters
Deaths from pneumonia in England
Deaths from dementia in England
Deaths from Alzheimer's disease
People from Lincoln, England
Radio Luxembourg (English) presenters
BBC Radio 2 presenters
People educated at Lincoln Grammar School